Isabella is a village in Hiiumaa Parish, Hiiu County, on the island of Hiiumaa, Estonia.

The village is first mentioned in 1565 (Isapalo by). Historically, the village was part of Kõrgessaare Manor, and Lauka Manor.

References
 

Villages in Hiiu County